is the second major label album release of the Japanese rock band, The Back Horn.  The album was released on November 13, 2002.

Track listing

WATABOUSHI (ワタボウシ) – 4:58
Game (ゲーム) – 3:56
Namida ga Koboretara (涙がこぼれたら) – 4:44
Fourth major single.
Natsukusa no Yureru Oka (夏草の揺れる丘) – 4:54
Materia (マテリア) – 4:43
Dinner (ディナー) – 4:37
Yuugure (夕暮れ) – 5:15
Yasei no Taiyō (野生の太陽) – 4:42
Sekaiju no Shita de (世界樹の下で) – 5:04
Third major single.
Nukumori Uta (ぬくもり歌) – 5:22

The Back Horn albums
2002 albums
Victor Entertainment albums